Nationality words link to articles with information on the nation's poetry or literature (for instance, Irish or France).

Events
 May–December – Lope de Vega serves in the Spanish Armada, where he begins writing his epic poem La Hermosura de Angélica.
 Christopher Marlowe writes The Passionate Shepherd to His Love either this year or in 1589 (first published 1599).

Works published

Great Britain
 William Byrd, editor, Psalmes, Sonets, & Songs of Sadnes and Pietie, Made into Musicke of Five Parts, anthology of verse set to music
 Thomas Churchyard, The Worthines of Wales, prose and poetry
 Angel Day, Daphnis and Chloe, prose and poetry, translated from the French of Jacques Amyot

Other
 Jean de Sponde, Essai de poemès chrétiens, published with a collection of prose meditations on four Psalms; France

Births
 June 11 – George Wither (died 1667), English poet and satirist
 Guillaume Bautru (died 1665), French satirical poet and a founder member of the Académie française
 Richard Brathwait (died 1673), English poet
 Leonard Digges (died 1635), English translator and poet
 Josua Stegmann (died 1632), German poet

Deaths
 June 18 – Robert Crowley (born 1517), English stationer, poet, polemicist and Protestant clergyman
 November 1 – Jean Daurat also spelled "Jean Dorat"; Latin name: "Auratus" (born 1508), French poet and scholar, member of the Pléiade
 Louis Bellaud (born 1543), French Occitan language writer and poet

See also

 Poetry
 16th century in poetry
 16th century in literature
 Dutch Renaissance and Golden Age literature
 Elizabethan literature
 English Madrigal School
 French Renaissance literature
 Renaissance literature
 Spanish Renaissance literature
 University Wits

Notes

16th-century poetry
Poetry